The 1989 LFF Lyga was the 68th season of the LFF Lyga football competition in Lithuania.  It was contested by 16 teams, and Banga Kaunas won the championship.

League standings

References
RSSSF

LFF Lyga seasons
football
Lith